The 2005–06 season was Olympiacos's 47th consecutive season in the Alpha Ethniki and their 80th year in existence. The club were played their 9th consecutive season in the UEFA Champions League. In the beginning of the summertime Olympiacos named Norwegian Trond Sollied coach.

Squad

Club

The Management

Other information

Competitions

Overall

Alpha Ethniki

Classification

Results summary

Results by round

Matches
No match dates available in this article

Olympiacos - AEK 3-0
Olympiacos - Akratitos 2-0
Olympiacos - Apollon Kalamarias 2-1
Olympiacos - Atromitos 3-0
Olympiacos - Egaleo 5-1
Olympiacos - Ionkos 0-0
Olympiacos - Iraklis 2-1
Olympiacos - Kallithea 2-1
Olympiacos - Larissa F.C. 4-0
Olympiacos - Levadiakos 1-0
Olympiacos - OFI Crete 4-0
Olympiacos - Panathinaikos 3-2
Olympiacos - Panionios 5-0
Olympiacos - PAOK 1-2
Olympiacos - Skoda Xanthi 2-0
AEK - Olympiacos 1-3
Akratitos - Olympiacos 0-1
Apollon Kalamarias - Olympiacos 1-2
Atromitos - Olympiacos 0-1
Egaleo - Olympiacos 1-3
Ionikos - Olympiacos 0-1
Iraklis - Olympiacos 2-0
Kallithea - Olympiacos 0-3
Larissa - Olympiacos 2-1
Livadiakos - Olympiacos 3-2
OFI Crete - Olympiacos 1-0
Panathinaikos - Olympiacos 0-2
Panionios - Olympiacos 2-3
PAOK - Olympiacos 1-2
Skoda Xanthi - Olympiacos 1-0

Greek Cup

Fourth round

Fifth round

Quarter-finals

Semi-finals

Final

UEFA Champions League

Group stage

All times at CET

Team kit

|
||
|

References

External links 
 Official Website of Olympiacos Piraeus 

Olympiacos F.C. seasons
Olympiacos F.C.
Greek football championship-winning seasons